One athlete, Jeanne Lehair, was listed as representing World Triathlon at the 2022 European Championships in Munich. This is due to her being in the process of changing her national affiliation from France to Luxembourg.

Competitors
The following is the list of number of competitors in the Championships:

Triathlon

References

Nations at the 2022 European Championships